Thomas Hoersen (born 11 January 1972) is a German retired professional footballer who played as a defender.

References

Honours
Borussia Mönchengladbach
 DFB-Pokal: 1994–95; runner-up 1991–92

External links
 

1972 births
Living people
German footballers
Association football defenders
Borussia Mönchengladbach players
Borussia Mönchengladbach II players
MSV Duisburg players
SV Waldhof Mannheim players
Fortuna Düsseldorf players
Bundesliga players
2. Bundesliga players
Sportspeople from Mönchengladbach
Footballers from North Rhine-Westphalia